The 2012–13 Primera División season was the 122nd season of top-flight professional football in Argentina. It started on August 3, 2012 and ended on June 29, 2013. Twenty teams competed in the league, eighteen returning from the 2011–12 season and two promoted from the Primera B Nacional Championship (Championship winners River Plate and runners-up Quilmes). The two promoted clubs avoided relegation.

In the first half of the season Vélez Sarsfield became champion of the 2012 Torneo Inicial "Eva Perón", winning the “Evita Capitana” League Cup. In the second one Newell's Old Boys clinched the 2013 Torneo Final "Eva Perón", winning the “Juana Azurduy” League Cup.

In the Superfinal Vélez Sarsfield were crowned Argentina's Super champions after a 1–0 victory over Newell's Old Boys in Mendoza. This was the first overall league championship play-off in Argentina since 1991 when Newell's defeated Boca Juniors on penalties.

Independiente was relegated, for first time, to the Primera B Nacional Championship. The other relegated teams were San Martín (SJ) and Unión.

Format changes
The champion of the Torneo Inicial and Torneo Final met in a season ending championship final to determine the super champion. The format for each tournament remained the same as in previous seasons.

Relegation was also changed for the season. Instead of two teams facing direct relegation to the Primera B Nacional, three teams were directly relegated. The promotion/relegation playoffs were eliminated.

Teams
The teams ending the 2011–12 season in the bottom two places of the relegation table were Banfield and Olimpo. They played in the 2012–13 Primera B Nacional Championship. At the same time the 2011–12 Primera B Nacional Championship winners River Plate and runners-up Quilmes were directly promoted at the end of the season. 
San Lorenzo and San Martín (SJ) remained in the Primera División winning their Relegation/promotion playoffs to Instituto and Rosario Central.

Stadia and locations

Statistics

1. Superfinal is not included

Managerial changes

 Pre-season changes
1. Interim manager.
 Torneo Inicial
2.  Marcelo Vivas was interim manager in the 6th match.
3.  Carlos Mayor  was interim manager in the 14th and 15th matches.
4.  Víctor Bottaniz was interim manager in the 17th and 18th matches.
5.  Daniel Oldrá  was interim manager in the 17th match.
6.  Gustavo Zapata was interim manager in the 18th match.
 Torneo Final
7.  Fabián De Sarasqueta was interim manager in the 4th and 5th matches.
8.  Marcelo Vivas was interim manager in the 6th match.
9. Interim manager.
10.  Martín Zuccarelli was interim manager in the 8th and 9th matches.

Torneo Inicial
The Torneo Inicial was the first tournament of the season. It began on August 3, 2012 and ended on February 13, 2013.

Standings

Results

Top goalscorers

Torneo Final
The Torneo Final was the second and final tournament of the season. It began on February 8 and ended on June 23, 2013.

Standings

Results

Top goalscorers

Superfinal
The 2012-13 Superfinal was played on 29 June 2013 between Vélez Sarsfield, winners of the 2012 Torneo Inicial, and Newell's Old Boys, winners of the 2013 Torneo Final. The match was played at the neutral venue of the Estadio Malvinas Argentinas in Mendoza.

Vélez Sarsfield were crowned Super champions after a 1–0 victory over Newell's Old Boys. The Association recognised that title as a Primera División (league) championship.

As super champions of the 2012–13 season Vélez Sarsfield was qualified for the 2013 Supercopa Argentina, 2013 Copa Sudamericana and 2014 Copa Libertadores.

Details

 Sebastián Sosa (Vélez Sarsfield) saved a penalty kick from Scocco in the 30th.

Relegation

Source:

International qualification

2013 Copa Libertadores
Qualification for the 2013 Copa Libertadores tournament was awarded to the winners of the 2011/12 Clausura and 2012/13 Torneo Inicial tournaments. A third place was awarded to the Argentine side that proceeded furthest in the 2012 Copa Sudamericana tournament. Two more places were available to the teams who gain most points in the 2012 Argentine tournaments, and a league table showing those combined points is given below.

2013 Copa Sudamericana
Qualification for the 2013 Copa Sudamericana tournament was awarded to the winners of the 2012–13 Argentine Primera División and the 5 best non-finalists (if not qualified for 2013 Copa Libertadores second stage or relegated) according to the aggregate table of the 2012–13 Torneo Inicial and Torneo Final.

This aggregate table could also be used for award places for the 2014 Copa Libertadores.

References

External links
2012–13 Argentine Primera División season at Soccerway
Official regulations
Football-Lineups

1
Argentine Primera División seasons